Greg Wells is a Canadian record producer and songwriter.

Greg Wells may also refer to:

Greg Wells (baseball) (born 1954), baseball player 
Greg Wells (footballer, born 1950), Australian rules footballer for Melbourne and Carlton
Greg Wells (footballer, born 1952), Australian rules footballer for Geelong